The 1860 Illinois gubernatorial election was the twelfth election for this office.  Republican governor William Henry Bissell died early in his term, and incumbent governor John Wood did not seek re-election. Former Democratic Congressman and former Clerk of the U.S. House James C. Allen was the Democratic nominee. A Number of third-party candidates ran as well; none received over one percent of the vote.
At this time in Illinois history the Lieutenant Governor was elected on a separate ballot from the governor. This would remain the case until the adoption of the 1970 constitution.

Results

References

Illinois
1860
Gubernatorial
November 1860 events